Chiltonville is a small village in Plymouth, Massachusetts, United States. It is located south of Wellingsley, northeast of South Pond, and consists of the Eel River valley and the land that stretches south of the river to the Pine Hills. Plimoth Plantation is in the northeastern part of the village. Bramhall's Corner, the center of Chiltonville, is located less than a mile north of Plimoth Plantation Highway. It includes a general store, an antiques store and Chiltonville Congregational Church.

See also
 Neighborhoods in Plymouth, Massachusetts

References

Villages in Plymouth, Massachusetts
Villages in Massachusetts